Geoffrey Martyn Smith (born 1958–59) is an Australian Anglican bishop who has served as the Archbishop of Adelaide since 28 April 2017 and as Primate of Australia since 7 April 2020. Immediately prior to serving as archbishop, Smith was an assistant bishop, general manager and registrar of the Anglican Diocese of Brisbane.

Smith's past roles have included rector of Taraka, Papua New Guinea, first vicar of the parochial district of Sawtell-Bonville, national director of the Anglican Board of Mission - Australia and Bishop of the Southern Region in the Diocese of Brisbane. He was ordained a deacon at Grafton Anglican church in 1982 and priest in 1983.

References

1950s births
21st-century Anglican bishops in Australia
21st-century Anglican archbishops
Anglican archbishops of Adelaide
Primates of the Anglican Church of Australia
Assistant bishops in the Anglican Diocese of Brisbane
Living people
University of Queensland alumni